The Chi River is the longest river flowing wholly within Thailand. The name of the river is "Mae Si" in the Isan and Lao languages of the region, being transliterated as "Chi" in Bangkok-Thai. In wet seasons there are often flash floods in the floodplain of the Chi River basin.

Course
The river rises in the Phetchabun mountains, then runs east through the central Isan provinces of Chaiyaphum, Khon Kaen, and Maha Sarakham, then turns south in Roi Et, runs through Yasothon and joins the Mun in the Kanthararom district of Sisaket Province.

The river was an 18th-century migration route for the re-peopling of the Khorat Plateau by ethnic Lao people from the left (east) bank of the Mekong resettling on the right bank. This began in 1718 when the first king of the left bank Kingdom of Champasak, King Nokasad, sent a group of some 3,000 subjects led by an official in his service to found the first settlement in the Chi River valley—and indeed anywhere in the interior of the Khorat Plateau—Muang Suwannaphum in present-day Roi Et Province (a history recorded and remembered, largely in terms of the struggle to expand wet-rice cultivation in the river valley). Their descendants are now regarded as a separate ethnic group from the Lao to the north and the central Thai to the southwest.

Pop culture
Chi river is the setting of a Thai TV drama on Channel 7 HD, titled Chart Lam Chi (ชาติลำชี;  The River Chi's Protector).  It was an action-drama TV series that aired from March 14 to April 25, 2018, remake from namesake film in 1969 (starred by Mitr Chaibancha and Petchara Chaowarat).

References

Further reading

External links

Ostracods (Crustacea) from floodplain of the Chi River basin

Isan
Rivers of Thailand
Geography of Chaiyaphum province
Geography of Khon Kaen province
Geography of Maha Sarakham province
Geography of Phetchabun province
Geography of Roi Et province
Geography of Sisaket province
Geography of Yasothon province